The city hall of Tillamook, Oregon, located at 210 Laurel Avenue, was originally built as a post office, and is listed on the National Register of Historic Places.

See also
 List of United States post offices
 National Register of Historic Places listings in Tillamook County, Oregon

References

Buildings and structures in Tillamook County, Oregon
Buildings and structures completed in 1941
City halls in Oregon
Former post office buildings
National Register of Historic Places in Tillamook County, Oregon
Post office buildings on the National Register of Historic Places in Oregon